Wang Wenxuan (born 26 December 1999) is a Chinese footballer currently playing as a defender for Guangzhou.

Career statistics

Club
.

References

1999 births
Living people
Chinese footballers
Association football defenders
China League One players
Chinese Super League players
Villarreal CF players
Guangzhou F.C. players
Inner Mongolia Zhongyou F.C. players
Chinese expatriate sportspeople in Spain
Expatriate footballers in Spain
21st-century Chinese people